Several periodisations are employed for the periodisation of the Indus Valley Civilisation. While the Indus Valley Civilisation was divided into Early, Mature, and Late Harappan by archaeologists like Mortimer Wheeler, newer periodisations include the Neolithic early farming settlements, and use a stage–phase model, often combining terminology from various systems.

Periodisations
The most commonly used nomenclature classifies the Indus Valley civilisation into early, mature, and late Harappan phases. The Indus Valley Civilisation was preceded by local agricultural villages, from where the river plains were populated when water management became available, creating an integrated civilisation. This broader time range has also been called the Indus Age and the Indus Tradition.

Early, Mature, and Late Harappan

Early surveys by Sir Aurel Stein in Balochistan led to the discovery of numerous prehistoric sites of unknown association. Following excavations at Harappa and Mohenjo Daro, the prehistoric sites in Sindh and Baluchistan were thought to represent a culture that migrated from Baluchistan to the Indus Valley to establish the Indus Valley Civilisation. This notion was refuted by M.R. Mughal based on his discovery of earlier occupational phases in the Cholistan Desert. The term Early Harappan was coined by M. R. Mughal in his dissertation at the University of Pennsylvania which provided a synthesis of his many surveys and studies throughout Pakistan. This classification is primarily based on Harappa and Mohenjo Daro, assuming an evolutionary sequence. According to Manuel, this division "places the Indus Valley within a tripartite evolutionary framework, of the birth, fluorescence, and death of a society in a fashion familiar to the social evolutionary concepts of Elman Service (1971)."

According to Coningham and Young, it was "cemented [...] in common use" due to "the highly influential British archaeologists Raymond and Bridget Allchin [who] used similar subdivisions in their work." According to Coningham and Young, this approach is "limited" and "restricted," putting too much emphasis on the mature phase.

Shaffer: Harappan Tradition
Scholarship in archaeology commonly uses a variation of the Three-age system developed by Christian Jürgensen Thomsen to divide past societies into a Stone Age, a Bronze Age, and an Iron Age. Although this system is very useful for its original purpose of organizing museum collections, it is unable to fully characterize the dynamic and fluid nature of human inter-settlement relationships. To address this issue, archaeologists Gordon Willey and Philip Phillips (archaeologist) developed a system based on Culture-Historical Integration, or a heuristic concept for describing the distribution of "relatedness" across time and space. These concepts were later adapted by Jim G. Shaffer and Diane Liechtenstein as a potential solution to a similar problem in the Greater Indus Valley.

During his archaeological research in Afghanistan, Baluchistan, Pakistan, and India, Shaffer observed the fluid and adaptive nature of local customs in rural South Asia and the many ways that cultural practices interfaced with material culture. Based on both his extensive work in the field and these ethnographic observations, Shaffer developed a series of important critiques of archaeological theory. Shaffer and Liechtenstein argued that the colonial legacy of Mortimer Wheeler and Stuart Piggot led to the projection of colonial stereotypes onto the ancient past. As a result of these critiques, Shaffer adapted the system developed by Willey and Phillips into one suitable for the Indus Valley Civilisation. In his original publication, this complex social formation was termed the Harappan Tradition, after the type site at Harappa, Punjab. This term Tradition stems from his concept of Cultural Tradition or the "persistent configuration of basic technologies, as well as structure, in the context of geographical and temporal continuity".

Shaffer divided the broader Indus Valley Tradition into four eras, the pre-Harappan "Early Food Producing Era," and the Regionalisation, Integration, and Localisation eras, which correspond roughly with the Early Harappan, Mature Harappan, and Late Harappan phases. Each era can be divided into various phases. A phase is an archaeological unit possessing traits sufficiently characteristic to distinguish it from all other units similarly conceived. According to Shaffer, there was considerable regional variation, as well as differences in cultural sequences, and these eras and phases are not evolutionary sequences, and cannot uniformly be applied to every site.

According to Coningham and Young,

Coningham & Young raise theoretical concerns with Shaffer's periodisation, noting that

Eras
The Early Food Producing Era corresponds to ca. 7000-5500 BCE. It is also called the Neolithic period. The economy of this era was based on food production, and agriculture developed in the Indus Valley. Mehrgarh Period I belongs to this era. 
The Regionalisation Era corresponds to ca. 4000-2500/2300 BCE (Shaffer) or ca. 5000-2600 BCE (Coningham & Young). The Early Harappan phase belongs to this Era. According to Manuel, "the most significant development of this period was the shift in population from the uplands of Baluchistan to the floodplains of the Indus Valley." This era was very productive in arts, and new crafts were invented. The Regionalisation Era includes the Balakot, Amri, Hakra, and Kot Diji Phases.

The Integration Era refers to the period of the "Indus Valley civilisation". It is a period of integration of various smaller cultures.
The Localisation Era (1900-1300 BCE) is the fourth and final period of the Indus Valley Tradition. It refers to the fragmentation of the culture of the Integration Era. The Localisation Era comprises several phases:
 Punjab Phase (Cemetery H, Late Harappan). The Punjab Phase includes the Cemetery H and other cultures. Punjab Phase sites are found in Harappa and in other places.
 Jhukar Phase (Jhukar and Pirak) The Jhukar Phase refers to Mohenjo-daro and sites in Sindh.
 Rangpur Phase (Late Harappan and Lustrous Red Ware). The Rangpur Phase sites are in Kachchh, Saurashtra, and mainland Gujarat.
 The Pirak Phase is a phase of the Localisation Era of both the Indus Valley Tradition and the Baluchistan Tradition.

Possehl: Indus Age
Gregory Possehl includes the Neolithic stage in his periodisation, using the term Indus Age for this broader timespan, Possehl arranged archaeological phases into a seven-stage sequence: 
 Beginnings of Village Farming Communities and Pastoral camps 
 Developed Village Farming Communities and Pastoral camps
 Early Harappan
 Transition from Early Harappan to Mature Harappan
 Mature Harappan
 Posturban Harappan
 Early Iron Age of Northern India and Pakistan

According to Coningham & Young,

Rita Wright
A "similar framework" as Shaffer's has been used by Rita Wright, looking at the Indus "through a prism influenced by the archaeology of Mesopotamia," using the terms Early Food Producing Phase, Pre-Urban Phase, Urban Phase, and Post-Urban Phase.

Datings and alternative proposals

Early Food Producing Era
Rao, who excavated Bhirrana, claims to have found pre-Harappan Hakra Ware in its oldest layers, dated at the 8th-7th millennium BCE. He proposes older datings for Bhirrana compared to the conventional Harappan datings, yet sticks to the Harappan terminology. This proposal is supported by Sarkar et al.

Regionalisation Era
While the Early Harappan Phase was proposed to start at ca. 3300 BCE, the Regionalisation Era has been proposed to start earlier, at 4000 BCE to ca. 5000 BCE.

S. P. Gupta, taking into account new discoveries, periodised the Harappan Civilisation in a chronological framework that includes the Early, Mature, and Late Harappan Phase, and starts with the same date as the Regionalisation Era:

Integration Era

The consensus on the dating of the Integration Era, or Urban, or Mature Harappan Phase, is broadly accepted to be 2600-1900 BC.

Durée longue: Harappan Civilisation and Early Historic Period

Jonathan M. Kenoyer, and Coningham & Young, provide an overview of developmental phases of India in which the Indus Valley Civilisation and the Early Historic Period are combined. The post-Harappan phase shows renewed regionalisation, culminating in the integration of the Second Urbanisation of the Early Historic Period, starting ca. 600 BC, c.q. the Maurya Empire, ca. 300 BC.

Coningham & Young note that most works on urbanisation in early Indian history focus on either the Indus Valley Civilisation or the Early Historic Period, "thus continuing the long-standing division between the Indus and Early Historic." According to Coningham & Young, this division was introduced in colonial times, with scholars who claimed that "a distinct cultural, linguistic, and social transformation lay between the Indus Civilisation and the Early Historic," and perpetuated by "a number of post-Independence South Asian scholars." Coningham & Young adopt Shaffer's terminology "to better understand and explore the processes which led to the two main urban-focused developments in South Asia," and

They also note that the term "Integration Era" may not be applicable to the whole of South Asia for the period of the Mature Harappan Civilisation, because "large swathes of northern and southern South Asia were unaffected by what was, on a subcontinental scale, a regional feature."

Concordance of periodisations

See also 
Bhirrana
Iron Age in India
History of India

Notes

References

Sources

Further reading 
S.P. Gupta. The dawn of civilization, in G.C. Pande (ed.)(History of Science, Philosophy and Culture in Indian Civilization, ed., D.P. Chattophadhyaya, vol I Part 1) (New Delhi:Centre for Studies in Civilizations, 1999)
Kenoyer, J.M. 1998 Ancient Cities of the Indus Valley Civilization. Oxford University Press and American Institute of Pakistan Studies, Karachi.
Kenoyer, J. M. 1991a The Indus Valley Tradition of Pakistan and Western India. In Journal of World Prehistory 5(4): 331–385.
Kenoyer, J. M. 1995a Interaction Systems, Specialized Crafts and Culture Change: The Indus Valley Tradition and the Indo-Gangetic Tradition in South Asia. In The Indo-Aryans of Ancient South Asia: Language, Material Culture and Ethnicity, edited by G. Erdosy, pp. 213–257. Berlin, W. DeGruyter. 
Shaffer, J. G. 1992 The Indus Valley, Baluchistan and Helmand Traditions: Neolithic Through Bronze Age. In Chronologies in Old World Archaeology (3rd Edition), edited by R. Ehrich, pp. 441–464. Chicago, University of Chicago Press.

External links
Article with Timeline
Ancient Civilisations Timeline

Indus Valley civilisation
Prehistoric India
Prehistoric Pakistan
Periodization